Brucerolis bromleyana is a benthic species of isopods in the family Serolidae, found in the Southern Ocean.

The species was first described as Serolis bromleyana by Rudolf von Willemoes-Suhm in 1876. It was transferred to the genus, Brucerolis, in 2009 by Gary Poore and Melissa Storey,

External links 

Sphaeromatidea